The 1997–98 Sporting de Gijón season was the 36th season of the club in La Liga, the 22nd consecutive after its last promotion. The club ended the season as 20th qualified with only 13 points.

Overview
After avoiding the relegation in the previous season, Miguel Montes continued at the helm of the team, but he was quickly sacked after the first four rounds, where Real Sporting did not win any point, scored only three goals and received 14 against.

Antonio Maceda replaced him, but he was sacked after the 15th round, earning only two points in nine games. Maceda was replaced by José Manuel Díaz Novoa. Novoa achieved the first win in the league, ending with 23 rounds without winning any game, the worst streak in the history of La Liga. He resigned after the 31st round, being substituted by José Antonio Redondo, who only could win another game in his first match as head coach.

Real Sporting was relegated in March and ended the season with the lowest points in the history of the La Liga.

After the end of the season, the Player of the Season award was given to the supporters.

Squad

From the youth squad

Competitions

La Liga

Results by round

League table

Matches

Copa del Rey

Matches

Squad statistics

Appearances and goals

|}

References

External links
Profile at BDFutbol
Official website

Sporting de Gijón seasons
Sporting de Gijon